Tiago Alves Sales, known as Tiago Alves (born 12 January 1993), is a Brazilian footballer who plays for Japanese club Fagiano Okayama as a winger.

Club career
Born in São João do Araguaia, Pará, Tiago Alves graduated from Santos' youth setup. He made his professional debut on 2 February 2011, coming on as a second half substitute for Keirrison in a 2–2 away draw against Ponte Preta for the Campeonato Paulista championship. He scored his first professional goal on 27 March 2011, in the 3–2 away victory against Ituano.

On 16 May 2012 Tiago Alves was loaned to Série B club Boa Esporte, but returned to his parent club only three months later. On 3 December 2012, he was loaned to América Mineiro until the end of 2013 season.

Tiago Alves was subsequently loaned to Penapolense and Paraná, only appearing regularly with the latter. On 4 January 2015 he moved abroad for the first time in his career, signing for K League 1 side Pohang Steelers.

Tiago Alves made his debut for the club on 15 March, coming on as a second-half substitute and scoring his side's second in a 2–4 home loss against Ulsan Hyundai FC.

At the beginning of 2016, Tiago was loaned to Seongnam FC. He scored 13 goals and offered 5 assists to keep Seongnam in the K League 1.

On 1 August 2016, Thiago Alves transferred to Al-Hilal FC, signing a 3 year contract for an undisclosed fee.

In March 2017 Shimizu S-Pulse announced the signing of Tiago Alves on a season-long loan from Saudi Arabia’s Al Hilal.

Career statistics

References

External links
 

  ogol.com
 

1993 births
Living people
Sportspeople from Pará
Brazilian footballers
Association football forwards
Association football wingers
Campeonato Brasileiro Série A players
Campeonato Brasileiro Série B players
Santos FC players
Boa Esporte Clube players
América Futebol Clube (MG) players
Clube Atlético Penapolense players
Paraná Clube players
K League 1 players
Pohang Steelers players
Seongnam FC players
Jeonbuk Hyundai Motors players
Saudi Professional League players
Al Hilal SFC players
J1 League players
J2 League players
Shimizu S-Pulse players
Sagan Tosu players
Gamba Osaka players
Fagiano Okayama players
Brazilian expatriate footballers
Brazilian expatriate sportspeople in South Korea
Expatriate footballers in South Korea
Brazilian expatriate sportspeople in Saudi Arabia
Expatriate footballers in Saudi Arabia
Brazilian expatriate sportspeople in Japan
Expatriate footballers in Japan